The Canada Soccer Player of the Year award celebrates Canada's top male and female soccer players in recognition of their achievements with both the national teams and their respective clubs. Since 2007, voting has been conducted by Canadian coaches and media. Christine Sinclair currently holds the record for most awards, having been named Player of the Year a total of 14 times, including 11 consecutive years between 2004 and 2014.

Player of the Year Winners

Canadian Youth Player of the Year

Canadian Young Player of the Year
Beginning in 2018, the Canadian Soccer Association began awarding only one youth player of the year award for each gender to a U20 player. In 2020, due to the COVID-19 pandemic, it was awarded to a U23 player instead. Until 2017, they had awarded two awards to each gender - one for a U17 and another for a U20 player.

U20 Player of the Year

U17 Player of the Year

References

Notes

Canadian soccer trophies and awards